The 1969 ICF Canoe Slalom World Championships were held in Bourg St.-Maurice, France under the auspices of International Canoe Federation. It was the 11th edition. The mixed C2 team event returned for the third and final time after not being held at the previous championships. East Germany, having one medals at every occasion since 1951, didn't take part because of political reasons.

Note
Only two teams completed the course in the women's K1 team event.

Medal summary

Men's

Canoe

Kayak

Mixed

Canoe

Women's

Kayak

Medals table

References

External links
International Canoe Federation

Icf Canoe Slalom World Championships, 1969
ICF Canoe Slalom World Championships
International sports competitions hosted by France
Icf Canoe Slalom World Championships, 1969